Justice Powers (born April 7, 1996) is a gridiron football offensive tackle who currently a member of the Ottawa Redblacks of the Canadian Football League (CFL). He played college football at UAB. He has been a member of the Los Angeles Rams of the National Football League (NFL), Hamilton Tiger-Cats of the CFL, and Birmingham Stallions of the United States Football League (USFL).

College career
After graduating high school, he attended Trinity Valley Community College in Athens, Texas. He appeared in 12 games where he helped his team win the 2016 SWJCFC Championship.  He was also named 2016 JUCO Super Sophomore Selectee by Sporting News College Football Preview Magazine. The following year he played for UAB and played 27 games. In 2018 he was a UAB representative along with Spencer Brown on First-team All-Conference USA.

Professional career

Los Angeles Rams
After going undrafted in 2019 he was signed by the Los Angeles Rams on April 30, 2019. On May 21, 2019, he was waived.

Hamilton Tiger-Cats
On December 23, 2019, he was signed to the Hamilton Tiger-Cats. On July 29, 2021, he was released.

Birmingham Stallions
Powers was selected in the 7th round of the 2022 USFL Draft by the Birmingham Stallions. He was transferred to the team's inactive roster on April 30, 2022. He was moved back to the active roster on May 6. He was released on May 10.

Ottawa Redblacks
Powers signed with the Ottawa Redblacks of the CFL on May 11, 2022. However, he was released after the first 2022 pre-season game on May 29, 2022. The Redblacks re-signed Powers on September 20, 2022, approximately two-thirds of the way through the 2022 regular season.

References

Living people
1996 births
American football offensive tackles
UAB Blazers football players
Los Angeles Rams players
Hamilton Tiger-Cats players
Birmingham Stallions (2022) players
Ottawa Redblacks players